John Barret may refer to:

John Richard Barret (1825–1903), American politician
John Barret (divine) (1631–1713), English Presbyterian cleric
John Baret or Barret (died 1580), English lexicographer
John Barret (theologian) (died 1563), English Carmelite friar

See also
John Barrett (disambiguation)